Shuimen She Ethnic Township (水门畲族乡) is a township in Xiapu County.

Demographics
Shuimen is located in Fujian province, in the southeastern part of the country, 1,500 km south of Beijing. Its elevation is 354 meters above sea level and it has a population of people. The population consists of 5,967 females and 6,806 males. 15.0% were children under the age of 15, 73% adults aged 15–64, and 11.0% over 65.

Geography
The land around Shuimen is hilly. There are about 214 people per square kilometer around Shuimen. The nearest larger town is Songcheng,12.0 km southwest of Shuimen. The area around Shuimen is almost covered with mixed forest. In the region around Shuimen, islands are unusually common.

Climate
The climate is subtropical. The average temperature is 17 °C. The warmest month is July, at 24 °C, and the coldest December, at 7 °C. The average rainfall is 1,950 millimeters per year. The wettest month is June, with 274 millimeters of rain, and the wettest October, with 71 millimeters.

Notes

References 

Township-level divisions of Fujian
She ethnic townships
Ningde